Richard William Holden (born 9 September 1964) is an English former professional footballer who played as a winger for six clubs in a decade-long career.

Early life
Born at Cawder Gill Hospital, Holden forged an interest in football at an early age, playing in the back streets and fields of Skipton and Embsay.

Prior to and during his professional football career, Holden gained a degree in Human Movement at Carnegie College and a degree in Physiotherapy from the University of Salford.

Playing career

Burnley
While employed at West Marton Dairies, where he worked closely with cheese, in 1985 Holden was invited to train with Burnley. He made one League appearance for the Clarets, in a defeat at Leyton Orient the following year. He was asked to leave by incoming manager Brian Miller after being unable to commit to full-time training due to his degree course at Carnegie College.

During the summer of 1986, Holden played cricket for Saltaire in the Bradford League. It was during this period that he received a phone call from Halifax Town's assistant manager, Billy Ayre, asking him to play in some pre-season friendlies.

Halifax Town
Holden joined Halifax Town as an amateur in August 1986. The "Shaymen" were then under the leadership of Mick Jones. He made his debut in a 3–0 defeat by Burnley at Turf Moor. At the end of the 1986–87 campaign, he was named the club's Player of the Year. He was rewarded with a professional contract with a weekly wage of £125.

To supplement his income, until pre-season began he worked at Webb's chicken factory at Cross Hills.

He remained at Halifax until the spring of 1988, at which point Billy Ayre had taken over from Peterborough-bound Mick Jones. After 67 League appearances and twelve goals, he was sold to Watford for £125,000.

Watford
Holden signed a four-year contract with the Hornets, upping his weekly wage to £450, with a £50 appearance bonus. His signing-on fee was £10,000, split into three instalments, and he also received a £2,000-per-year loyalty bonus.

Oldham Athletic
Holden joined Oldham just as the club was about to embark on one of the most famous seasons in its history, better known as the "pinch-me season", when the club reached the semi-final of the FA Cup and the final of the League Cup. Holden appeared in 64 of the club's 65 games. He was ever-present in the club's first season in the top flight for 68 years, but, towards the end of the season, following a disagreement with manager Joe Royle, he transferred to Manchester City in July 1992.

Manchester City
Following a season at City and the club's change in management early in the 1993–94 season, new manager Brian Horton sold Holden back to Oldham.

Return to Oldham
He was ever-present as the club reached the semi-final of the FA Cup, only to be relegated from the Premier League.

Holden opted to stay with the club despite the decline, but further problems were to come when Joe Royle left the club to manage Everton. New manager Graeme Sharp, favouring Mark Brennan on the left, put Holden in the reserves.

Blackpool
Holden finished his career with Blackpool in 1995–96, then under the managership of Sam Allardyce. He suffered a ruptured anterior cruciate ligament in February 1996 and failed to recover from it. He had been playing for ten years without knowledge that he had ruptured his posterior cruciate ligament in his right knee.

Managerial career
In May 1996, Holden and his family moved to Peel on the Isle of Man. He worked at Noble's Hospital and became head of its outpatient physiotherapy department.

Shortly after arriving on the island, offers came in from local clubs wanting Holden to play for them. He started to turn out for Peel, and in 1999 became their manager. He played 199 games for them, scoring 105 goals (including 47 in 48 matches during the 1996–97 season). He left the club in 2003.

After leaving Nobles in May 1999, Holden went into private practice at the Mount Murray Hotel.

He subsequently became assistant manager and head physio at Barnsley in 2004 to managers Paul Hart and former Oldham teammate Andy Ritchie. With Ritchie, he helped Barnsley gain promotion to the Championship in 2006.

In 2007, after living in Cullingworth, West Yorkshire, Holden returned to the Isle of Man and opened Island Physiotherapy, based at Peel F.C., where he was once again manager of the team until August 2014.

Career statistics

Honours
Oldham Athletic
Football League Cup runner-up: 1990

Individual
Halifax Town A.F.C. Player of the Year: 1986–87

Publications

References
Specific

1964 births
Living people
Footballers from North Yorkshire
People from Skipton
Association football wingers
English footballers
Kiveton Park F.C. players
Burnley F.C. players
Halifax Town A.F.C. players
Watford F.C. players
Oldham Athletic A.F.C. players
Manchester City F.C. players
Blackpool F.C. players
Premier League players
English Football League players
English football managers
Alumni of the University of Salford
Association football physiotherapists
English autobiographers